Helen O'Neill may refer to:

 Helen O'Neill (academic), development scholar and professor at University College Dublin
 Helen O'Neill (journalist), Australian freelance journalist and author
 Helen O'Neil (archaeologist) (1893–1984), English archaeologist

See also
Helen Neil, wife of Alexander Mackenzie, Prime Minister of Canada